Plots with a View, released internationally as Undertaking Betty, is a 2002 British romantic black comedy film written by Frederick Ponzlov, directed by Nick Hurran, starring Brenda Blethyn, Robert Pugh, Alfred Molina, Naomi Watts, Lee Evans and Christopher Walken. The film began filming in Caldicot, Monmouthshire, Wales in 2002, and was released in the U.S. on 12 November 2005, with a DVD release on 7 March 2006.

Plot
Boris Plots is director of Plots Funeral Home in the fictional Welsh village of Wrottin Powys. His rival Frank Featherbed, an American, is determined to revolutionise the undertaking business in Britain through the innovation of "themed funerals".

Boris dreamed of only two things as a young boy: dancing and Betty Rhys-Jones. Betty secretly loved Boris, but could not fight her father's wishes, so she was married off to a gold digger.

Giving up his dreams, Boris took over the family's undertaking business. When Betty's mother-in-law dies, they are thrust together again and as they discuss the funeral arrangements for Betty's mother-in-law, the old spark is rekindled.

Boris discovers that the only obstacle between their love for one another is her marriage to the adulterous Councilor Hugh Rhys-Jones. In a desperate bid for happiness Boris and Betty decide to stage her death and run away together.

At the same time, Hugh's mistress and secretary insists that they try to poison her. Before they can, Boris and Betty go through with their plan, but Frank rushes to the scene. He and Boris fight over the right to handle the funeral arrangements. After an argument and scuffle, the medical examiner said it was her dying wish to be handled by Plots.

In the church, both the mistress and Hugh talk about her, she about the affair, he gloating about inheriting all of her money. Then he insists watching while Boris seals the lid, making it impossible for Betty to sneak away.

With a lot of difficulty, Boris manages to free Betty with only Frank and his right-hand man discovering the secret. She and Boris enlist their help, after Boris and Frank agree to split the funeral business. Together they help Betty scare Hugh and the secretary (setting up the house with ghostly gadgets), who both flee.

Betty also appears as a ghost to neighbor boy Billy, whose mum passed before, telling him his mum says hi, and she loves him very much. We learn Betty leaves everything to young Billy, and an allowance to Hugh if he follows a long list of conditions. The girl goes on Jerry Springer as a haunted mistress; Betty and Boris go on the Princess cruise they were planning; their cats go too.

Cast
 Brenda Blethyn as Betty Rhys-Jones
 Robert Pugh as Hugh Rhys-Jones
 Alfred Molina as Boris Plots
 Naomi Watts as Meredith Mainwaring
 Lee Evans as Delbert Butterfield
 Christopher Walken as Frank Featherbed

Production
The movie was filmed on location in Wales in Monmouthshire, South Glamorgan, Vale of Glamorgan, Rhondda Cynon Taff, and Denbighshire.

The dance sequences were choreographed by Peter Darling and the costumes were designed by Ffion Elinor.

Reception
The 2002 Variety review noted its "near-miraculous balance between the silly and the morbid" and referred to it as "enjoyable and entertainingly cast" even though it was "unlikely to bury the competition". In 2005, the Los Angeles Times described it as succeeding in sustaining its "deliberate silliness" though it might work better for home viewing than in theatres, and described its cast as "first rate." DVD Talk was less enthusiastic: "though kind of a mess, and not really all that funny, Undertaking Betty still feels barely recommendable, thanks to a colorful cast of true characters." Reel Film gave it 3 of 4 stars, and described it as "charming, low-key romantic comedy", and though there's "nothing especially groundbreaking or even memorable about Undertaking Betty, but the undeniably sweet vibe is ultimately quite difficult to resist."

Recognition
The film was nominated for a Golden Hitchcock at the 2002 Dinard British Film Festival, and won a Cymru Award at the 2003 BAFTA Awards, Wales.

References

External links
 
 
 
 

2002 romantic comedy films
2002 films
British black comedy films
Films directed by Nick Hurran
Films scored by Rupert Gregson-Williams
British romantic comedy films
2000s English-language films
2000s British films